Georges Robert, was born in Courseulles on 31 January 1875, and died in Paris on 2 March 1965. He was an officer of the French Navy and an administrator. He ended his military career with the rank and title of admiral. He is mainly known for his role as High Commissioner of the Vichy regime for the French overseas territories of the Western Atlantic (French West Indes, Guiana and Saint Pierre and Miquelon).

Biography

Family and education 
Georges Robert came from a family of manufacturers, who produced high quality hand made lace. In 1893, at the age of eighteen, he entered the École navale, after studying at the Institution Saint-Joseph in Caen, then at the Naval College in Cherbourg. Georges Robert was appointed ensign in 1900 and took part in an eighteen-month campaign in Madagascar.

First World War 
As a lieutenant, he commanded the submarine Phoque, then the destroyer Mameluk in 1915. He took part in the naval operations in the Dardanelles campaign, where he was involved in rescuing the shipwrecked crew of the state transport Admiral Hamelin. After graduating from the École de guerre navale, he became a frigate captain in 1916 and commanded the torpedo boat Commandant Rivière, then the torpedo boat Casque.

Between the wars 
He was promoted to captain in 1921, Rear admiral in 1926, vice admiral in 1930, and appointed inspector general of maritime forces in the Mediterranean in 1932. He was awarded the Grand Cross of the Legion of Honour in 1909. In the year he reached the age of retiral, he was admitted to the 2nd section in 1937 with the rank and designation of admiral.

Second World War 
He was recalled to active duty at his request, by the Minister of Colonies, Georges Mandel on 7 June 1939, sailing on the cruiser Jeanne d'Arc on 1 September, 1939. Arriving in Fort-de-France a fortnight later he took up the political role of High Commissioner of France in the West Indies, Saint-Pierre-et-Miquelon and Guiana on 15 September. The aircraft carrier  which carried 107 aircraft bought by France from the United States before the armistice. The oil tanker , the aviso  and a large garrison in Martinique. After the Armistice, rather than the pre-war aim of establishing a Western Atlantic theatre of operations, Robert's men were to ensure the protection of a stock of 286 tons of gold of the Bank of France evacuated from metropolitan France.

He refused the resolutions made in support of Free France by the General Councils of Martinique and Guadeloupe of 14 June 1940, taking the view that external pressure was being exerted on the legislature. The General Councils requested the transfer of power to them in application of article 1 of the law of 15 February 1872. In Guadeloupe, the socialist politician Paul Valentino, spoke to denounce the Vichy regime, and with a small group of followers went to the governer's residence to demand that rule be transferred to the Council - Constant Sorin refused to receive them. In Martinique, Victor Sévère, then the deputy mayor of Fort-de-France resigned, expressing his opposition. However, Robert had received a High Commissioner's powers from Vichy France, which made him an authority over the existing colonial framework in the French Caribbean. Backed by the fleet, he quickly established authority over the islands' governors, then removed the elected officials of their General Councils. In Martinique the Council was replaced with appointees from the small white population on the island.

During the period of hostilities, Robert organised the defence of maritime communications in liaison with his British counterpart in Bermuda. In his memoire, Robert argued that his support for Vichy was essential, as he had "an overriding obligation to safeguard the national sovereignty, as represented by the home government, in legal succession to the Third Republic in a period of alarming crisis". His administration made use of censorship from the start, as he stated: "The High Commissioner will inform, not be informed. My aim is to ensure complete cooperation by means of informing public opinion according to the directives of ... [Marshal Petain]". In March and April 1941, the police examined 15,767 personal letters. Suzanne Cesaire ran afoul of the regime's pre-publication censorship when applying for a paper ration to print Tropiques; it could only reestablish publication after 1943. Vichy's Jewish statute was enacted and enforced; in Fort-de-France, the number of people who registered as required was sixteen. However, some French Jews were able to find refuge from deportation in Martinique, through the work of Varian Fry's Emergency Rescue Committee.

High Commissioner for the West Atlantic Theatre (1939-1943) 
The United States having recognised the Vichy government, Admiral Robert negotiated with them. In return for a guarantee of his neutrality, he obtained the necessary supplies. When the United States entered the war in December 1941, Robert confirmed past commitments remained to Frederick Horne (Vice-Chief of American Naval Operations). Horne confided that he was preparing an important landing in Morocco at the end of October 1942. The French Admiralty received this information via emissary on 17 April 1942. In April 1943, the United States suspended supplies to the West Indies. In the resulting crisis, Vichy, which no longer had diplomatic relations with Washington, ordered the ships and gold scuttled. "He (Admiral Robert) was able to make Vichy believe that all the aircraft had been destroyed". In the same vein, he used subterfuge to save the ships, pretending to scuttle them and maintaining his neutrality.  

From April 1943, there was an uprising of the population against the Vichy administration. Firstly, the creation of the Martinique Committee for National Liberation (CMLN) by Victor Sévère and Emmanuel Rimbaud. On 24 June, a crowd gathered in Fort-de-France organised by the Martinique Committee for National Liberation to cry, "". Admiral Robert prepared his succession as directed by the French Committee for National Liberation (CFLN) in Algiers. The Committee appointed the diplomat Henri Hoppenot.  After French Guiana rallied to Free France in March 1943, an insurrection broke out on 24 June in front of the Fort-de-France war memorial. On 29 June, the garrison of the Balata camp (a suburb of Fort-de-France) joined the dissidence under the orders of Major Henri Tourtet. Admiral Robert announced his departure on 30 June. On 14 July, Henri Hoppenot - then ambassador of Free France in Washington - landed on the island, mandated by the CFLN. The next day, Admiral Robert handed over his powers to him, then left the island for the United States, via Puerto Rico, with some of his entourage. 

Hoppenot ratified the rallying of the island to Free France. He also appointed a new governor, René Ponton, administrator of the colonies and a Free French officer in Equatorial Africa. On his arrival in Fort-de-France, Hoppenot courteously explained that his predecessor "had maintained complete and inviolate French sovereignty over the West Indies for four years and that at the time of supreme decisions, resisting the repeated orders that Berlin had transmitted to him from Vichy, Admiral Robert had handed over an intact gold reserve and fleet to the French authorities". This thesis of the maintenance of French sovereignty and the conservation of gold is often put forward and is based on Robert's own memoirs. It does not remove the fact that Robert did not back Free France because of his distrust in its local representatives, or because of his view of the importance of his mission to safeguard the assets of the Banque de France; or that Pétain received him in Vichy, in 1943.

Operation Asterisk 
Operation Asterisk was an Allied plan to provoke an uprising on the island if Admiral Robert had refused to negotiate a neutral settlement after accepting the armistice.

Antillean and Guianese response and memory 
Through this period West Indians and Guianese reproached Robert for ignoring local interests. They objected to his authoritarian stance and his handling of shortages, especially of food. An early decision to base about 5000 sailors and infantrymen on Martinique affected the social and economic balance of the island. They were also unconvinced by attempts to popularise Robert through public display of his image and use of Creole to hail him as "". Above all, they reproached him for his contempt for local politicians, for not having sided with General de Gaulle from the outset, his repression of dissidents, his catholic and bourgeois origins. Thousands of young men and women left the island on small boats to join the Free French on Dominica and St Lucia ( is the Antillean term for resistance). To do this, they had to brave routes crossed by strong Atlantic currents and possible betrayal by smugglers. Once they had arrived and made contact with the Free French, who were headquartered on Dominica, they would be found places to train and other support by local representatives. Dissidents were trained in Fort Dix, Camp Edwards and Camp Patrick Henry; they were formed into the 1st Antillean Marching Battalion, then sent to North Africa, in part as the  later integrated into the 1st Free French Division. There is a memorial dedicated to the Free French in Roseau near the Neg Mawon Emancipation Monument. A plaque was also dedicated to the volunteers of Guadeloupe, Martinique and Guiana at the Hôtel des Invalides in Paris in 2014. 

Admiral Robert's administration is still remembered by Martinicans, especially older ones. The disruption of imports from Metropolitan France led to serious shortages and in April 1943, the United States blockade worsened living conditions. Basic necessities such as flour, salted meat, soap and cloth were unavailable for weeks on end and had to be substituted by local products, even cutting petrol with rum to fuel cars. The harshness of this period has become a byword, evoked in Creole by saying "", that is, "in Robert's time". Guadeloupeans refer to the period as "", Governor Sorin's time. Although the number of people still living who remember the period directly is dwindling, it has inspired a number of prominent literary works from Antillean authors, including Mayotte Capécia's I Am a Martinican Woman, Raphaël Confiant's  and in Creole, Tony Delsham's .

Trial 
In September 1944, Admiral Robert was accused of collaboration and imprisoned in Fresnes. Provisionally released on 24 March 1946, he appeared before the High Court of Justice on 14 March 1947. He was sentenced to ten years hard labour. Yet, the sentence was suspended at the request of the High Court Justice. The judges for his case noted that he had been favourable to the British, concluding a modus vivendi with them after Operation Catapult on 3 July 1940. He had maintained his neutrality during the occupation of Saint-Pierre and Miquelon by the Free French Naval Forces. They noted his obedience to Vichy was purely formal and maintained for local diplomatic and utilitarian purposes. Also, that the testimonies of the American authorities were complimentary and that he had challenged the procedure of swearing in the Head of State, Philippe Pétain, as being "superfluous and dangerous".

He walked out of court free. Six months later, his sentence was remitted. He received a total amnesty and was reinstated in his rank and title of admiral and kept his decorations on 15 April 1954. He was acquitted in 1957.

General de Gaulle's reproaches 
In his , de Gaulle wrote:

Decorations 

 Grand-croix de la Légion d'honneur
 Order of the Francisque

Filmography 

 2015: Rose and the Soldier

Notes and references

Bibliography 

 Hervé Coutau-Bégarie, Claude Huan, Mers el-Kébir. La rupture franco-britannique, Paris, Economica, 1994.
 Jean-Baptiste Bruneau, La marine de Vichy aux Antilles, juin 1940-juillet 1943, Paris, Les Indes Savantes, 2014.
 Georges Robert, La France aux Antilles de 1939 à 1943, Paris, Plon, 1950, 228 pages.
 United States Department of State, Communications between Fort-de-France and Washington 1940–1943 (with a farewell message from Roosevelt to Admiral Robert).
 Journal de bord du contre-torpilleur Mameluck n° - / 1915 (20 August – 3 December 1915) – then commanded by Lieutenant Robert – (Extract; S.G.A. "Mémoire des hommes", Cote SS Y 336, p. num. 245).
 Tibéry, Denis Lefebvre et Jean-Pierre Pécau: L'Or de France (volume 1, "La croisière de l’Emile Bertin" and volume 2, "12 milliards sous les Tropiques"), Le Lombard, 2011 and 2012.

École Navale alumni
History of Martinique
People of Vichy France
French colonial governors and administrators
Order of the Francisque recipients
1875 births
1965 deaths